Chromium nitride is a chemical compound of chromium and nitrogen with the formula CrN. It is very hard, and is extremely resistant to corrosion. It is an interstitial compound, with nitrogen atoms occupying the octahedral holes in the chromium lattice: as such, it is not strictly a chromium(III) compound nor does it contain nitride ions (N3−). Chromium forms a second interstitial nitride, dichromium nitride, Cr2N.

Synthesis
Chromium(III) nitride can be prepared by direct combination of chromium and nitrogen at 800 °C:

2 Cr +  → 2 CrN

It can also synthesize by Physical Vapour Deposition technique such as Cathodic arc deposition.

Applications
CrN is used as a coating material for corrosion resistance and in metal forming and plastic moulding applications. CrN is often used on medical implants and tools. CrN is also a valuable component in advanced multicomponent coating systems, such as CrAlN, for hard, wear-resistant applications on cutting tools.

Magnetism
The fundamental materials physics of CrN, giving rise to its favorable properties, has been debated recently in high-profile scientific journals such as Nature Materials. In particular, the importance of magnetism in both the low temperature and the high temperature phases has been demonstrated by means of quantum mechanical calculations of the electronic structure of the compound.

Natural occurrence
Though rare, carlsbergite - the natural form of chromium nitride - occurs in some meteorites.

References

Chromium(III) compounds
Nitrides
Rock salt crystal structure
Coatings